Skyline is a suburb of Honiara directly South of the main center.

References

Populated places in Guadalcanal Province
Honiara